Falling Satellites is the third studio album by UK neo-progressive rock group Frost*.

Jem Godfrey explains that concept of this album is "In this instance – life. This is my midlife crisis album! The whole album is a message to enjoy life while you have it. My dad died 4 weeks before I completed “Falling Satellites” and I suddenly realized how fleeting life actually is. He’d been procrastinating for years while writing a book he’d always wanted to write when he died. But now it will never be finished and it made me understand that every single second of being alive is precious. The whole album is about that – do that thing you’ve been meaning to do for ages NOW and get it done.." in the interview. This is their only album to feature the drummer Craig Blundell.

Track listing 

 "First Day" – 1:37
 "Numbers" – 4:21
 "Towerblock" – 6:13
 "Signs" – 6:36
 "Lights Out" – 3:52
 "Heartstrings" – 6:20
 "Closer to the Sun" – 7:20
 "The Raging Against the Dying of the Light Blues in 7/8" – 7:49
 "Nice Day for It..." – 6:37
 "Hypoventilate" – 2:00
 "Last Day" – 3:01
 "Lantern" – 3:45
 "British Wintertime" – 6:29

Personnel
Jem Godfrey – keyboards, piano, Chapman Railboard, vocals
John Mitchell – electric guitars, violin, vocals
Nathan King – bass guitar
Craig Blundell – drums
Joe Satriani – guitar solo (track 7)
Tori Beumont – vocals (track 5)

References

External links
Frost* Main Site

2016 albums
Frost* albums
Inside Out Music albums